Eber is an ancestor of the Ishmaelites and the Israelites according to the "Table of Nations" in the Book of Genesis and the Books of Chronicles.

Lineage 
Eber was a great-grandson of Noah's son Shem and the father of Peleg, born when Eber was 34 years old, and of Joktan. He was the son of Shelah, a distant ancestor of Abraham. According to the Hebrew Bible, Eber died at the age of 464.
  
In the Septuagint, the name is written as Heber/Eber, and his father is called Sala. His son is called Phaleg/Phalek, born when Heber was 134 years old, and he had other sons and daughters. Heber lived to an age of 464 years.

Name 

The Aramaic/Hebrew root  is connected with crossing over and the beyond. Considering that other names for descendants of Shem also stand for places, Eber can also be considered the name of an area, perhaps near Assyria. A number of mediaeval scholars such as Michael the Syrian, Bar Hebraeus, and Agapius the Historian mentioned the prevailing view, that the Hebrews had received their name from Eber, while also pointing out that according to others, the name "Hebrew" meant "those who cross", in reference to those who crossed the Euphrates river with Abram from Ur to Harran, and then to the land of Canaan.

Hebrew 
The 13th-century Muslim historian Abu al-Fida relates a story noting that the patriarch Eber (great-grandson of Shem) refused to help with the building of the Tower of Babel so that his language was not confused when it was abandoned. He and his family alone retained the original human language (a concept referred to as lingua humana in Latin), Hebrew, a language named after Eber. (There are different religious positions on this issue; see also Adamic language.)

[Genesis 10:21] Also to Shem, the father of all the Children of Eber, and the older brother of Japheth, children were born. (NASB)

In Islam

Eber is sometimes referred to in classical Islamic writings as the "father" of the "prehistoric, original Arabs" (the ʿArab al-ʿĀriba), who lived in the Arabian Peninsula after the Deluge. Eber was also identified with the Quranic prophet Hud by some of the early Muslim authorities. Other sources identify the prophet Hud as Eber's son.

The mystic Abdulaziz ad-Dabbagh gives the following genealogy: Eber bin Shayyā' bin al-Ḥārith bin Kilāb bin Qaydār bin Ishmael.

See also
 Habiru

References

External links

 Easton's Bible Dictionary:  Eber | Heber | Hebrew
 Smith's Bible Dictionary:  Eber | Heber | Hebrew
 International Standard Bible Encyclopedia: Eber | Heber| Hebrew

Book of Genesis people
Books of Chronicles people
Hebrews